Miljan Rovcanin (born 6 December 1993) is a Serbian professional boxer.

Early life and amateur career
Rovcanin was born in Bar, FR Yugoslavia. He had a very successful amateur career.

Professional career
He began professional boxing at the age of eighteen and become the youngest cruiserweight professional boxer in 2012.
He won the 2012 World Boxing Foundation International Title in the cruiserweight division at the age of eighteen. On 21 April 2017, he faced Serbian boxer Dusan Krstin at Hall of Sports in Zaječar and won the Serbian Heavyweight Title.

Rovcanin vs Dimitrenko
Heavyweight contender #11 IBF Alexander Dimitrenko (40-3-1, 26 KOs) surprisingly fought to a 10 round draw against for him little known replacement opponent Miljan Rovcanin (18-0-1, 13 KOs). Dimitrenko was originally scheduled to fight Adnan Redzovic, but Adnan dropped out and he got stuck with Rovcanin. It was confirmed that Rovcanin and Dimitrenko would fight on 22 Dec 2017 on Friday night at the Edel-Optics.de Arena in Hamburg, Germany. Both fighters spent all night clinching each other. It was a beautiful display of textbook clinching by Rovcanin and Dimitrennko. The scores were 96-90 for Dimitrenko, and 94-92 for Rovcanin, The third judge scored it 93-93. In the 2nd round, Rovcanin did a lot of holding to stifle Dimitrenko’s offense. Rovcanin threw a lot of weak jabs, and used movement to keep out of range. Dimitrenko missed a lot of shots, and looked confused. Rovcanin did the better work in the first half of the fight against a clearly over-the-hill Dimitrenko. In rounds 8, 9 and 10, Rovcanin gassed out badly and let Dimitrenko get back into the fight. Dimitrenko was lucky he didn’t lose this match.
The German Federation - the BDB - have acted upon an official protest from EC Boxing and heavyweight Alexander Dimitrenko - and changed the result in the fight Dimitrenko (41-3, 26 KOs) had against Miljan Rovcanin (18-1).
The outcome was changed from a draw to a win for Dimitrenko - and now Rovcanin suffers his first career defeat. The reason for the change is that Rovcanin had a total of three points deducted - two in the third and one in the seventh during the fight - and according with the BDB rules he should have been disqualified in the seventh when the third point deduction was made.

Professional boxing record

External links

Serbian male boxers
1993 births
Living people
People from Bar, Montenegro
Serbs of Montenegro
Heavyweight boxers